Washington's 33rd legislative district is one of forty-nine districts in Washington for representation in the state legislature.

It is in King County and consists of east Burien, Normandy Park, SeaTac, Des Moines and parts of Kent, Tukwila, and Renton.

The district's legislators are state senator Karen Keiser and state representatives Tina Orwall (position 1) and Mia Gregerson (position 2), all Democrats.

See also
Washington Redistricting Commission
Washington State Legislature
Washington State Senate
Washington House of Representatives

References

External links
Washington State Redistricting Commission
Washington House of Representatives
Map of Legislative Districts

33